Silverlink was a train operating company in the United Kingdom owned by National Express that operated the North London Railways franchise from March 1997 until November 2007. At the end of 2007 Silverlink Metro services were taken over by London Overground and Silverlink County services were taken over by London Midland.

History
The North London Railways franchise was awarded to National Express on 7 February 1997. National Express commenced operating the franchise on 3 March 1997.

After initially trading as North London Railways, in September 1997 the franchise was rebranded as Silverlink.

The franchise was due to finish on 15 October 2006, but on 11 August 2006 the Department for Transport granted an extension until 10 November 2007. Upon its closure, its London metro services were taken over by London Overground and the remainder were merged with Central Trains' western services to form London Midland.

Branding
Silverlink had two sub-brands:

Silverlink Metro was used for services primarily within Greater London: 
North Woolwich - Richmond (the North London Line)
Willesden Junction - Clapham Junction (the West London Line)
London Euston - Watford Junction via Willesden Junction (the Watford DC line)
Gospel Oak - Barking (the Gospel Oak to Barking Line)
Silverlink County was used for services beyond Greater London:
London Euston - Northampton (Birmingham New Street until 2004)
Watford Junction - St Albans Abbey (the St Albans Abbey Line)
Bletchley - Bedford (the Marston Vale Line)

Silverlink Metro
Silverlink Metro operated these services.

Note: Changes during the franchise period are noted but changes to the lines before and after the franchise are not.

North London line
These services ran on the North London line:

† At the end of service on Saturday 9 December 2006 the line between Stratford and North Woolwich closed, as much of the route was duplicated by the Docklands Light Railway and the Jubilee line, leaving Stratford as the eastern terminus of the North London Line.

West London line
These services ran via the West London line:

Shepherd's Bush on the West London Line was due to open under the franchise (with signage in Silverlink colours installed), but platform widening work meant that it finally opened in September 2008 under London Overground management, the signage being replaced with the London Overground roundels by that time.

Watford DC line
These services ran on the Watford DC line:

† = also served by the Bakerloo line.

Gospel Oak to Barking line
These services ran on the Gospel Oak to Barking line:

Silverlink County

Birmingham/Northampton

Birmingham Line services ran on the slow lines of the West Coast Main Line. The service was cut back to Northampton in September 2004, with services north of Northampton being transferred to partner operator Central Trains, and some through services remained. (Central Trains, like Silverlink, was a subsidiary of National Express and the operations shared rolling stock.) 

Prior to 2004 the service also continued to Birmingham, calling at the following stations:

Abbey Line
These services ran on the Abbey Line

Marston Vale line

Performance
Silverlink was categorised as a London and South East operator by the Office for Rail Regulation (ORR) and was one of the best performing TOCs in this sector with a PPM (Public Performance Measure) of 90.8% for the last quarter of the financial year 2006/7. Despite these figures, the Silverlink Metro franchise on the North London Line was regarded by frequent travellers as offering a poor service, with extremely congested trains and an unreliable service with some trains cancelled shortly before they were due to arrive. A London Assembly report described the service as "shabby, unreliable, unsafe and overcrowded".

Rolling stock
Silverlink inherited a fleet of Class 117 and Class 121 diesel multiple units, and Class 313 and Class 321 electric multiple units, from British Rail.

To replace the elderly Class 117s and 121s, which operated the Gospel Oak - Barking and Bletchley - Bedford services, seven Class 150 Sprinters were transferred from Central Trains in summer 1999; an eighth followed in 2006. Pending the Sprinters' arrival, Silverlink hired Class 31 locomotives from Fragonset to top and tail Mark 2 carriages on Bletchley - Bedford services in 1998/99.

The Class 313s operated Metro services on the electrified routes; they were joined on the Euston - Watford Junction service in 2003 by three Class 508s transferred from Merseyrail. The Class 321s operated County services to Northampton and Birmingham; they were joined in 2005 by new Class 350s. The Watford Junction - St Albans Abbey service was operated for many years by Class 313s, but later was usually operated by Class 321s with Silverlink Metro drivers and Silverlink County guards.

On 16 July 2004, Virgin Trains announced that it was withdrawing most of its stops at Milton Keynes Central, which were used by up to 6,000 passengers a day. Commuters became unhappy at the prospect of switching to older Silverlink trains, and a longer journey. Silverlink countered this with the temporary usage of ex-Virgin stock, still in Virgin colours.

The Strategic Rail Authority decided to divert thirty four-carriage Siemens Desiro trains from an order placed by South West Trains to provide stock with faster acceleration for the West Coast Main Line operators. These trains, the Class 350s, were not allocated to a specific operator, but were instead used jointly by Silverlink and Central Trains, both owned by National Express.

Pending the arrival of these trains, from September 2004 Silverlink introduced two sets of Mark 3 carriages, formerly of Virgin Trains, hauled by Virgin Class 87 and EWS Class 90 electric locomotives on peak-hour Northampton services. Additionally, five Class 321s were hired from One, another National Express-owned operator.

Fleet

Depots
Silverlink's fleet was maintained at Bletchley Depot.  Following Virgin Trains ceasing to operate electric locomotives, Silverlink's Metro fleet moved to Willesden Depot.

In 2006 Alstom proposed closing Willesden. Closure would have left the Class 508s homeless and the Class 313s having to return to Bletchley Depot which was due to close. On 12 May 2007 Silverlink took over direct running of the depot and its staff for the final six months of its franchise.

Demise
As part of a wider redrawing of the rail franchise map by the Department for Transport, the Silverlink network was to be broken up when it was renewed in November 2007.

The Silverlink Metro services were moved to the control of Transport for London under the banner of the London Overground.  On 19 June 2007 Transport for London announced it had awarded the London Overground concession to a Laing Rail/MTR joint venture.

The Silverlink County services were merged with the Central Trains services around Birmingham to create a new West Midlands franchise.  On 22 June 2007 the Department for Transport announced it had awarded the West Midlands franchise to Govia.

Silverlink's services transferred to London Overground Rail Operations and London Midland on 11 November 2007.

References

External links

 
 National Express Group website

|- 

Defunct train operating companies
London Overground
National Express companies
Railway companies established in 1997
Railway companies disestablished in 2007
Railway operators in London
1997 establishments in England
2007 disestablishments in England